The West Branch Oyster River is a  tributary of the Oyster River in Warren, Maine. From its source, the stream runs about 2 miles south and 1 mile east to its confluence with the main stem of the Oyster River.

See also 
 List of rivers of Maine

References 

 Maine Streamflow Data from the USGS
 Maine Watershed Data From Environmental Protection Agency

Rivers of Knox County, Maine
Rivers of Maine